Gumus may refer to:

 Gümüş, various things